The 2021 Copa de la Liga Profesional was the second edition of the Copa de la Liga Profesional, an Argentine domestic cup. It began on 12 February and ended on 4 June 2021.

Due to the worsening of the COVID-19 pandemic in Argentina, the President of Argentina suspended all the activities, including the Copa de la Liga Profesional, between 22 and 30 May 2021. Therefore, the semi-finals and final of the tournament were rescheduled for 31 May and 4 June 2021, respectively.

The competition was contested by the 26 teams that will take part in the Primera División during the 2021 season, including the two promoted teams from the 2020 Primera Nacional (Sarmiento (J) and Platense). Boca Juniors were the defending champions but they were eliminated in the semi-finals.

Colón won their first top-flight professional title after they defeated Racing 3–0 in the final. As champions, Colón qualified for the 2022 Copa Libertadores.

Vélez Sarsfield, top team of the Zone B, were eliminated in the quarter-finals.

Format
For the group stage, the 26 teams were drawn into two groups of thirteen teams each, playing on a single round-robin basis. Additionally, each team played one interzonal match against its rival team in the other zone. In each group, the top four teams advanced to the quarter-finals. The final stages (quarter-finals, semi-finals and final) were played on a single-legged basis.

Draw
The draw for the group stage was held on 3 February 2021, 19:00, at Hilton Hotel in Buenos Aires. The 26 teams were drawn into two groups of thirteen containing one team from each of the interzonal matches.

Group stage
In the group stage, each group was played on a single round-robin basis. Additionally, each team played one interzonal match against its rival team in the other zone. Teams were ranked according to the following criteria: 1. Points (3 points for a win, 1 point for a draw, and 0 points for a loss); 2. Goal difference; 3. Goals scored; 4. Head-to-head points; 5. Head-to-head goal difference; 6. Head-to-head goals scored; 7. Play off match; 8. Draw.

The top four teams of each group advanced to the quarter-finals.

Zone A

Zone B

Results

Zone A

Zone B

Interzonal matches

Final stages
Starting from the quarter-finals, the teams played a single-elimination tournament on a single-leg basis with the following rules:
 In the quarter-finals the higher-seeded team hosted the leg, while the semi-finals were played at a neutral venue.
 If tied, a penalty shoot-out would be used to determine the winners.
 The Final was played at a neutral venue.
 If tied, extra time would be played. If the score was still tied after extra time, a penalty shoot-out would be used to determine the champions.

Bracket

Quarter-finals

|}

Matches

Semi-finals

|}

Matches

Notes

Final

|}

Match

Statistics

Top goalscorers 

Source: AFA

References

External links 
 LPF official site

A
2021 in Argentine football
Copa de la Liga Profesional